The 1897–98 season was the fourth in the history of the Southern League. Southampton won the Division One championship for the second successive season. Bristol City applied for election to Division Two of the Football League. However, they were not elected.

Division One

A total of 12 teams contest the division, including eleven sides from previous season and one new team.

Newly elected team:
 Bristol City

Division Two

A total of 12 teams contest the division, including ten sides from previous season and two new teams.

Newly elected teams:
 Royal Artillery Portsmouth
 St Albans

Promotion-relegation test matches
Unlike previous seasons in which individual test matches had been played between clubs, this season saw the bottom two clubs in Division One and the top two clubs in Division two play in a four-club round robin, with the top two retaining or earning a place in Division One. Both Division Two clubs were promoted after the matches, with Northfleet leaving the league after the season ended.

Football League elections
Only one Southern League club, Bristol City, applied for election to Division Two of the Football League. However, they were not elected. Although Darwen were initially voted out of the league, a decision was made to expand the League by four clubs, and they were readmitted, along with New Brighton Tower, Glossop North End and Barnsley.

References

External links
Southern League First Division Tables at RSSSF
Southern League Second Division Tables at RSSSF

1897-98
1897–98 in English association football leagues